For other people of the same name see Billy Lane and Billy Lane (angler)

William Henry Charles Lane (23 October 1904 – 10 November 1985) was an English football centre forward, best remembered for his time in the Football League with Watford and Brentford, making over 120 appearances for each club.

Club career 
After playing for the London City Mission, Gnome Athletic and Park Avondale, Lane joined Tottenham Hotspur in 1922 for the first time but left the club without appearing in a senior match. He went on to play for Summerstown and Barnet before re-joining Tottenham after a spell with the club's "nursery" team Northfleet United. Lane, a centre forward, went on to feature in 36 matches and found the net on 12 occasions between 1924 and 1926. Lane's time with Spurs came to an end after manager Peter McWilliam dropped him after Lane kicked the ball into the crowd after having a goal disallowed in a match versus Preston North End. Lane had been courting the attention of the England selectors at the time, who were present at the match, but unimpressed with his behaviour. The incident ended Lane's chances of an international call-up and his Tottenham career.

After leaving White Hart Lane, Lane appeared for Leicester City (joining for £2250), Reading and Brentford, where he scored 89 goals in 123 appearances. As of 2015, his record of seven league hat-tricks is second behind club record-holder Jack Holliday and his 33-goal haul in the 1929–30 season was a club record until Holliday broke it in 1932–33. Despite his excellent form for the Bees, Lane was transfer-listed by manager Harry Curtis, who needed the money from Lane's sale to fund the transfer of Middlesbrough players Jack Holliday, Bert Watson and Billy Scott. Lane signed for Watford in a £1500 deal in 1932 and the following year scored a hat-trick in the Football League in under three minutes against Clapton Orient on 20 December 1933, then a record. He featured in a total of 136 matches for Watford in all competitions, scoring 77 goals and went on to have spells at Bristol City, Clapton Orient and finally Gravesend United.

Managerial and coaching career 
In 1945, Lane turned down the manager's job at Clapton Orient to return to Brentford as a coach under Harry Curtis. He remained with the Bees before going into management with Guildford City. He later moved on to manage Brighton & Hove Albion and Gravesend & Northfleet. He managed Brighton & Hove Albion to its first ever Football League title, as 1957–58 Third Division South champions. After leaving Gravesend & Northfleet, Lane became a scout for Arsenal and later returned to Brighton & Hove Albion in a similar role. He was still working for Albion at the time of his death in 1985.

Personal life 
Lane served as a PT instructor during the Second World War.

References

1904 births
1985 deaths
Footballers from Tottenham
English footballers
Gnome Athletic F.C. players
Tottenham Hotspur F.C. players
Summerstown F.C. players
Barnet F.C. players
Northfleet United F.C. players
Leicester City F.C. players
Reading F.C. players
Brentford F.C. players
Watford F.C. players
Bristol City F.C. players
Leyton Orient F.C. players
Gravesend United F.C. players
English Football League players
Southern Football League players
English football managers
Guildford City F.C. managers
Brighton & Hove Albion F.C. managers
Ebbsfleet United F.C. managers
Southern Football League managers
English Football League managers
Arsenal F.C. non-playing staff
Brentford F.C. non-playing staff
Association football forwards
Brighton & Hove Albion F.C. wartime guest players
Clapton Orient F.C. wartime guest players
Reading F.C. wartime guest players
Watford F.C. wartime guest players
Military personnel from Middlesex
British military personnel of World War II